Warangal Metro is a proposed metro system to serve the city of Warangal, Telangana, India with a stretch of 15 kilometers, from Kazipet railway station to Warangal railway station through its suburbs. The system is proposed to reduce traffic congestion as well as providing a modern and efficient public transport system in the city. The Detailed Project Report (DPR) is being prepared by Maha Metro.

References

Proposed rapid transit in India
Transport in Warangal